The Astra C was a 1912 French single engine biplane, manufactured by Société Astra at Villacoublay. In 1913, the Astra CM Hydro-avion three-seat floatplane version was used to make the world's first scheduled passenger-carrying flights.

Design and development
The Astra C was initially designed as a single seat biplane, powered by a single 50 hp Renault engine in tractor configuration. It was constructed primarily as wooden framework sections, covered in canvas and wire-braced. The fuselage was of triangular cross section, with a wheeled main undercarriage plus nose skid and tail skid. The wings were of unequal span, and employed wing-warping for roll control.

The Astra CM was developed from the Astra C, with a more powerful engine and added accommodation for two observers, for military reconnaissance.

The Astra Hydro, (an Astra CM 'Hydro-avion' (seaplane)), was a further development in 1913, with a  Renault V-12 engine and 3 Tellier floats (2 main floats , and one small tail float). The wooden frame elements were largely replaced by steel tubes, and the wing ribs and floats were the principal remaining wooden components. at least two were built and an order for two from the Royal Navy (RN), serialled 106 and 107, was not completed.

Operational history
During the St. Malo races, 14-26 August 1912, the first CM Hydro was flown to first place by Labouret. The second CM Hydro, powered by  a horizontally mounted  Salmson M.9 water-cooled radial engine, flew at Monaco but crashed.

On 22 March 1913, using at least one Astra CM Hydro-avion, French operator Compagnie générale transaérienne started the world's first scheduled passenger-carrying flights, operating from Cannes to Nice. Two passengers could be carried. On 29 March 1913, the service was extended to Monte Carlo.

Variants
Astra C
Civil version, with 50 hp Renault engine.
Astra CM
Military version, with 75 hp Renault or 75 hp Chenu engine.
Astra Hydro
Floatplane version of the Astra CM, with 100 hp Renault engine.

Operators

Compagnie générale transaérienne

Royal Hellenic Navy
Hellenic Naval Air Service

Specifications (Astra CM)

References

Bibliography
 Thomas, Andrew. "In the Footsteps of Daedulus: Early Greek Naval Aviation". Air Enthusiast, No. 94, July–August 2001, pp. 8–9.

Further reading

External links
 Photo Astra CM, Motor 75 hk Renault, Norsk Luftfartsmuseum
 Astra seaplane with Renault V-12 engine (Canada Aviation & Space Museum/Corbis via Getty Images)
 EADS.com - bad link

See also

1910s French sport aircraft
1910s French military reconnaissance aircraft
C
Biplanes
Single-engined tractor aircraft
Aircraft first flown in 1912